James David Maslow (born July 16, 1990) is an American actor, singer and dancer. He played the role of James Diamond on Nickelodeon's Big Time Rush, had roles in Getaway and The Frozen Ground, and is a member of the boyband Big Time Rush.

He also starred as Kevin Mohr on the Sony Crackle original series Sequestered.

In 2014, Maslow competed as a contestant on the eighteenth season of Dancing with the Stars, in which he reached fourth place. In 2018, Maslow was cast as one of the celebrity houseguests on the first American edition of Celebrity Big Brother where Maslow finished in sixth place.

Early life
James Maslow was born in New York City, New York and raised in La Jolla, California. Born to a Jewish father and a Catholic mother, he was raised Jewish.

At the age of six, Maslow began training as a singer when his parents placed him in the San Diego Children's Choir. He attended La Jolla and Torrey Pines elementary schools, Muirlands Middle School, and San Diego School of Creative and Performing Arts (SDSCPA). He had a small role in the San Diego Opera's production of La bohème when he was 10 years old. He attended acting camp at the La Jolla Playhouse, and got his first agent when he was 14. At SDSCPA, he portrayed lead roles in select feature productions, including Danny Zuko in "Grease" (2004) and Marius in "Les Miserables" (2006). Maslow transferred from SDSCPA partway through the tenth grade, switching to Coronado School of the Arts (CoSA). He graduated from CoSA's musical theater department in 2007.

Career

2007–2014:

James Maslow made his acting debut in 2008 as Shane in an episode of the Nickelodeon show iCarly. He also appeared in urFRENZ in 2009, Wild Things: Foursome in 2010, and Arena in 2011. In 2010, he appeared in Easy A as himself. In 2013, he appeared in Getaway as Max and The Frozen Ground as Daniel O'Brian. Also in 2013, he filmed an episode of See Dad Run, playing the role of actor Scott Baio's former TV son, Ricky. In 2007, James Maslow sent his audition tape for a new Nickelodeon sitcom and received the role of James Diamond two years later in the show Big Time Rush, along with Kendall Schmidt, Carlos Pena Jr., and Logan Henderson. They also formed the real boy band Big Time Rush. An album of original songs from the first season plus some others was released October 11, 2010, entitled B.T.R. It sold 67,000 copies in its first week and was certified Gold by the RIAA five months later in March 2011. On November 21, 2011, the band released their second album called "Elevate" which sold over 70,000 copies on its first week. James Maslow and his bandmates co-wrote 8 out of the 12 songs.James Maslow wrote "Elevate", co-wrote "Love Me Love Me" and the first single from the album, "Music Sounds Better With U". The UK version of the album included a bonus song called "Epic" which he also helped write.

James Maslow and Big Time Rush have a third album called 24/Seven which was released on June 11, 2013. The band promoted the album with the tour shared with Victoria Justice called the Summer Break Tour. which began on June 21 and ended on August 15. On late Winter 2014, James Maslow and the band went to their latest tour called "Big Time Rush Live 2014 World Tour", where they performed in Texas and 7 countries in Latin America.

2021-Now: 
In 2020 James Maslow and the rest of Big Time Rush posted a video of them say to stay safe during quarantine. The next year Big Time Rush came out with a single called "Call It Like I See It" and did 2 shows in New York and Chicago. The next year in 2022 February 25, The Forever Tour came out and "Not Giving You Up"

2014–present: Solo career
On March 4, 2014, ABC announced that Maslow would take part in the 18th season of Dancing with the Stars. He was paired with professional dancer Peta Murgatroyd. Ultimately, Maslow made it to the finals, but was eliminated on the first night. Maslow finished in fourth place, with an average score of 26.9 (excluding scores from guest judges). In a vote on Twitter, Maslow was nevertheless chosen "in a landslide" to perform an encore of his freestyle dance during the season finale. During his time on the show, Maslow earned the first perfect score of the season for his contemporary dance to "Let It Go" from Frozen on Disney Night. He featured on the cover of the July 2014 issue of FitnessRx Magazine.

Also in 2014, Maslow was cast in the 2015 Lifetime television movie Seeds of Yesterday in the leading role of Bart Foxworth. He released his first single "Lies" on July 24, 2015. He has also released another single called "Circles" on October 23, 2015. In addition, he has two covers, "Cheerleader" and "One Call Away" available for purchase on iTunes. In 2017, Maslow debuted his solo album titled, How I Like It from which he has highlighted the single by the same name. Towards the end of 2017, James collaborated with director Joshua Schultz for his music video for the song "Who Knows", off his "How I Like It" debut album. In 2018, Maslow competed in the first American season of Celebrity Big Brother where he was evicted on day 24.

In 2018, Maslow released new singles "Falling" and "All Day".

Most recently, on April 26, 2019, Maslow released "Love U Sober", and announced that he is about to start releasing more singles.

In May 2019, it was announced that Maslow would be starring in independent film We Need to Talk, co-starring Emily Bett Rickards, and written and directed by Todd Wolfe.

Filmography

Films

Television

Web

Discography

Studio albums

Singles

As lead artist

As featured artist

Other appearances

Awards and nominations
Maslow received a nomination in 2014 at the annual Young Hollywood Awards for hottest body which he lost to former Dancing With The Stars competitor Derek Hough. In the same year, Maslow again received recognition for his charitable efforts with the annual VH1 Do Something! "Celebs Gone Good Awards", though he failed to make the winners list as Taylor Swift had won that time for the third consecutive Year. In addition to these nominations, James Maslow was nominated as Favorite International TV Star at the Australian Kids Choice Awards in 2010 and also again in 2011. He has also been recognized with an Australian Astra Award nomination for Favorite International Actor or Personality at the 2011 event, but did not win. In 2014, Maslow along with cast and crew of the Sony Crackle drama series Sequestered received 2 International Academy of Web Television Awards (IAWTVA) for Best Drama Series and one for Best Ensemble Cast losing both bids. As a musician, in July 2017, Maslow was declared the winner of Macy's iHeartRadio Rising Star competition and opened the iHeartRadio Music Festival.

References

External links

 
 

1990 births
Living people
21st-century American male actors
21st-century American male musicians
21st-century American singers
American child singers
American male child actors
American male models
American male pop singers
American male singers
American male television actors
American people of Jewish descent
Big Time Rush (band) members
Male actors from New York City
Male actors from San Diego
Male models from California
Male models from New York (state)
Models from New York City
Models from San Diego
Musicians from San Diego
Participants in American reality television series
People from La Jolla, San Diego
People from San Diego
Singers from California
Singers from New York City
American male dancers
American rock songwriters
American rock singers
American male film actors
American pop rock singers
American male voice actors